Cigaritis ella, the Ella's bar, is a butterfly of the family Lycaenidae. It is found from South Africa to the coast of eastern Kenya. In South Africa it is found from the Eastern Cape along the coast to KwaZulu-Natal, then inland to Eswatini, the Free State, Mpumalanga, Gauteng, Limpopo, North West and Northern Cape.

The wingspan is 21–24 mm for males and 25–30 mm for females. Adults are on wing year-round with peaks from August to October and from March to July.

The larvae feed on Ximenia caffra. The larvae hide in crevices and under the bark of their host plant.

References

External links
Die Gross-Schmetterlinge der Erde 13: Die Afrikanischen Tagfalter. Plate XIII 69 f, g

Butterflies described in 1865
Cigaritis
Butterflies of Africa
Taxa named by William Chapman Hewitson